Camdonia Chelsea SC is a football club in St Vincent and the Grenadines.
They currently play in the National Club Championship First Division. The club hails from the town of Campden Park in Saint Andrew Parish.

Squad

Achievements
NLA Premier League: 4
2009/2010 – 2010/11., 2017, 2018.

Achievements
Saint Vincent and the Grenadines Football Championship: 1
1998

CFU Club Championship: 1 appearance
1999 – First Round

External links
St. Vincent and the Grenadines Football Federation

References

Football clubs in Saint Vincent and the Grenadines
1995 establishments in Saint Vincent and the Grenadines